Undecanol, also known by its IUPAC name 1-undecanol or undecan-1-ol, and by its trivial names undecyl alcohol and hendecanol, is a fatty alcohol.  Undecanol is a colorless, water-insoluble liquid of melting point 19 °C and boiling point 243 °C.

Industrial uses and production

It has a floral citrus like odor, and a fatty taste and is used as a flavoring ingredient in foods. It is commonly produced by the reduction of undecanal, the analogous aldehyde.

Natural occurrence

1-Undecanol is found naturally in many foods such as fruits (including apples and bananas), butter, eggs and cooked pork.

Toxicity
Undecanol can irritate the skin, eyes and lungs. Ingestion can be harmful, with the approximate toxicity of ethanol.

References

External links
icsc MSDS

Fatty alcohols
Primary alcohols
Alkanols